The 2002 WPA World Nine-ball Championship was the 13th edition of the WPA World Championship for 9-Ball Pool. It took place from July 18 to 24, 2002 in Cardiff, Wales.

The event was won by American Earl Strickland with a 17:15 victory in the final against Francisco Bustamante.
Defending champion Mika Immonen was defeated in the round of 64 against Shannon Daulton.

Format
The 128 participating players were divided into 16 groups, in which they competed in round robin mode against each other. The top four players in each group qualified for the final round played in the knockout system.

Prize money
The event's prize money stayed similar to that of the previous years, with winner Earl Strickland winning $65,000.

Preliminary round
The following 64 players dropped out in the group stage:

Final round

References

External links
Live scoring at WPA-pool.com
 Empire Poker WPA World Pool Championship 2002  at azbilliards.com

2002
WPA World Nine-ball Championship
WPA World Nine-ball Championship
International sports competitions hosted by Wales